The parish of Trinity Church has three separate burial grounds associated with it in New York City. The first, Trinity Churchyard, is located in Lower Manhattan at 74 Trinity Place, near Wall Street and Broadway. Alexander Hamilton, Albert Gallatin, and Robert Fulton are buried in the downtown Trinity Churchyard.

The second Trinity parish burial ground is the St. Paul's Chapel Churchyard, which is also located in lower Manhattan (roughly ), six blocks north of Trinity Church. It was established in 1766. Both of these churchyards are closed to new burials.

Trinity's third place of burial, Trinity Church Cemetery and Mausoleum, located in Hamilton Heights in Upper Manhattan, is one of the few active burial sites in Manhattan. Trinity Church Cemetery and Mausoleum is listed on the National Register of Historic places and is the burial place of notable people including John James Audubon, John Jacob Astor IV, Mayor Edward I. Koch, Governor John Adams Dix, Ralph Ellison, and Eliza Jumel.  In 1823 all burials south of Canal Street became forbidden by New York City due to city crowding, yellow fever, and other public health fears.

After considering locations in the Bronx and portions of the then-new Green-Wood Cemetery, in 1842 Trinity Parish purchased the plot of land now bordered by 153rd street, 155th street, Amsterdam, and Riverside to establish the Trinity Church Cemetery and Mausoleum. The cemetery is located beside the Chapel of the Intercession that Audubon co-founded in 1846, but this chapel is no longer part of Trinity parish. James Renwick, Jr., is the architect of Trinity Church Cemetery and further updates were made by Calvert Vaux. The uptown cemetery is also the center of the Heritage Rose District of New York City.

A no-longer-extant Trinity Parish burial ground was the Old Saint John's Burying Ground for St. John's Chapel. This location is bounded by Hudson, Leroy and Clarkson streets near Hudson Square. It was in use from 1806 to 1852 with over 10,000 burials, mostly poor and young. In 1897, it was turned into St. John's Park, with most of the burials left in place. The park was later renamed Hudson Park, and is now James J. Walker Park.  (This park is different from a separate St. John's Park, a former private park and residential block approximately one mile to the south that now serves as part of the Holland Tunnel access.)

Notable burials

Trinity Churchyard (Broadway and Wall Street)
 William Alexander, Lord Stirling (1726–1783), Continental Army major general during the American Revolution
 John Alsop (1724–1794), Continental Congress delegate
 William Bayard Jr. (1761–1826), banker
 William Berczy (1744–1813), Canadian painter and pioneer buried in unmarked grave and name recorded as William Burksay
 William Bradford (1660–1752), colonial American printer
 Richard Churcher (1676–1681), a child whose grave is marked with the oldest carved gravestone in New York City
 Angelica Schuyler Church (1756–1814), daughter of Philip Schuyler, sister of Elizabeth Schuyler Hamilton and  Margarita Schuyler Van Rensselaer
 Michael Cresap (1742–1775), frontiersman
 James De Lancey (1703–1760), Colonial Governor of New York
 John R. Fellows (1832–1896), U.S. representative
 Robert Fulton (1765–1815), inventor of the first commercially successful steamboat
 Albert Gallatin (1761–1849), U.S. congressman, Secretary of the Treasury, founder of New York University
 Horatio Gates (1727–1806), Continental Army general during the American Revolution
 James Gordon (1735–1783), 80th Regiment of Foot (Royal Edinburgh Volunteers) Lieutenant Colonel
 Aaron Hackley, Jr. (1783–1868), U.S. representative
 Alexander Hamilton (1755/57–1804), American revolutionary patriot and  Founding Father; first U.S. Secretary of the Treasury, and a signer of the United States Constitution, husband of Elizabeth Schuyler Hamilton
 Elizabeth Schuyler Hamilton (1757–1854), co-founder and deputy director of New York's first private orphanage, now Graham Windham
 Philip Hamilton (1782–1801), first son of Elizabeth Schuyler Hamilton and Alexander Hamilton, grandson of U.S. General Philip Schuyler, nephew of Angelica Schuyler Church and Margarita Schuyler Van Rensselaer
 John Sloss Hobart (1738–1805), U.S. senator
 William Hogan (1792–1874), U.S. congressman
 James Lawrence (1781–1813), naval hero during the War of 1812
 Francis Lewis (1713–1802), signer of the Declaration of Independence
 Walter Livingston (1740–1797), delegate to the Continental Congress
 Luther Martin (1744–1826), delegate to the Continental Congress
 Charles McKnight (1750–1791), Continental Army surgeon
 John Jordan Morgan (1770–1849), U.S. representative
 Hercules Mulligan (1740–1825), spy during the American Revolution, friend of Alexander Hamilton
 Thomas Jackson Oakley (1783–1857), U.S. representative
 John Morin Scott (1730–1784), Continental Congress delegate, Revolutionary War general, first secretary of state of New York
 George Templeton Strong (1820–1875), diarist, abolitionist, lawyer
 Robert Swartwout (1779–1848), brigadier general, Quartermaster general of the War of 1812
 Silas Talbot (1750–1813), U.S. Navy commodore, second captain of the USS Constitution
 John Watts (1749–1836), U.S. representative
 Franklin Wharton (1767–1818),  Commandant of the Marine Corps, 1804–1818
 Hugh Williamson (1735–1802), American politician, signer of the Constitution of the United States
 John Peter Zenger (1697–1746), newspaper publisher whose libel trial helped establish the right to a free press

In the northeast corner stands the Soldiers' Monument, with a plaque reading: "At a meeting of Citizens held at the City Hall of the City of New York June 8, 1852: It was resolved That the Erection of a becoming Monument with appropriate inscriptions by Trinity Church to the Memory of those great and good Men who died whilst in Captivity in the old Sugar House and were interred in Trinity Church Yard in this City will be an act gratifying not only to the attendants of this Meeting but to Every American Citizen."

The claim those prisoners are buried in Trinity Churchyard is disputed by Charles I. Bushnell, who argued in 1863 that Trinity Church would not have accepted them because it supported Great Britain. Historian Edwin G. Burrows explains how the controversy related to a proposal to build a public street through the churchyard.

Trinity Church Cemetery and Mausoleum (770 Riverside Drive)

 Amsale Aberra (1954–2018), Ethiopian-American fashion designer and entrepreneur
 Mercedes de Acosta (1893–1968), writer, socialite
 Rita de Acosta Lydig (1876–1929), socialite
 John Jacob Astor (1763–1848) business magnate, progenitor of the Astor family of New York
 John Jacob Astor III (1822–1890), financier and philanthropist
 John Jacob Astor IV (1864–1912), millionaire killed in the sinking of the Titanic
 John Jacob Astor VI (1912–1992), shipping magnate
 William Backhouse Astor, Sr. (1792–1875), real estate businessman
 William Backhouse Astor, Jr. (1829–1892), businessman and race horse breeder/owner
 John James Audubon (1785–1851), ornithologist and naturalist
 Will Barnet (1911–2012), artist
 Estelle Bennett (1941–2009), member of the 1960s girl group The Ronettes
 John Romeyn Brodhead (1814–1873) Historian of early colonial New York
 John J. Cisco (1806–1884), Assistant Treasurer of the United States under Presidents Franklin Pierce, James Buchanan, and Abraham Lincoln
 John Winthrop Chanler (1826–1877), United States Congressman
 Robert Winthrop Chanler (1872–1930), muralist and designer
 William Astor Chanler (1867–1934), United States Congressman
 Cadwallader D. Colden (1769–1834), Abolitionist New York Manumission Society (1806–1834);  Mayor of New York City (1818–1821)
 William Augustus Darling (1817–1895), United States Congressman
 Alfred D'Orsay Tennyson Dickens (1845–1912), lecturer on the life of his father, Charles Dickens
 John Adams Dix, (1798–1879) soldier, United States Senator, Secretary of the Treasury, Governor of New York, statesman
 Ralph Ellison, (1914–1994), novelist, critic, and educator, author of Invisible Man
 Henry Erben (1832–1909), rear admiral of the United States Navy, serving in the American Civil War and Spanish-American War
 Herman D. Farrell Jr. (1932–2018), New York State Assembly member
 Madeleine Talmage Force (1893–1940), socialite, Titanic survivor, second wife of John Jacob Astor IV
 Bertram Goodhue (1869–1924), American architect and typeface designer, designed the Rockefeller Chapel at the University of Chicago
 Cuba Gooding Sr. (1944–2017), singer and actor
 Edward Haight (1817–1885), United States Congressman
 Katherine Corri Harris (1890–1927), American silent film actor
 Abraham Oakey Hall (1826–1898), Mayor of New York City
 Anthony Philip Heinrich (1781–1861), American composer and founding chair of the New York Philharmonic Society
 Geoffrey Lamont Holder (1930–2014), Trinidadian-American actor, dancer, and choreographer, principle actor for the Metropolitan Opera Ballet in New York City, portrayed Baron Samedi in Live and Let Die
 David Hosack (1769–1835), physician, botanist, educator, tended to Alexander Hamilton's mortal wound
 Charles C. Ingham (1797–1863), Irish-American portraitist
 Eliza Jumel (1775–1865), second wife of Aaron Burr
 Dita Hopkins Kinney (1855–1921) first superintendent of United States Army Nurse Corps (1901–1909)
 Edward I. Koch (1924–2013), Mayor of New York City (1978–1989)
 John Lewis (1920–2001), American jazz pianist and founder of the Modern Jazz Quartet
 Robert O. Lowery (1916–2001) first African-American New York City Fire Commissioner (1966–1973)
 George Malloy (1920–2008) pianist, accompanied Camilla Williams singing "The Star-Spangled Banner", preceding Martin Luther King Jr. delivering his "I Have a Dream" speech, during the August 1963 March on Washington for Jobs and Freedom
 Robert Bowne Minturn (1805–1866) prominent New York merchant, philanthropist; shipper owner of Flying Cloud
 James Monroe (1799–1870), U.S. Congressman
 Clement Clarke Moore (1779–1863), clergyman, attributed author of Christmas poem A Visit from St. Nicholas
 Jerry Orbach (1935–2004), actor
 Samuel B. Ruggles (1799–1881), politician, member of the New York State Assembly, donated land used to create Gramercy Park in New York City
 Francis Shubael Smith (1819–1887), co-founder of Street & Smith publishing
 Caroline Webster Schermerhorn (1830–1908), socialite, doyenne of Gilded Age New York society
 Thomas Fielding Scott (1807–1867), first missionary Episcopal Bishop of Washington and Oregon
 Samuel Seabury (1873–1958), New York City Judge, not to be confused with the known rival of Alexander Hamilton
 Frederick Clarke Withers (1828–1901), English-American architect in the High Victorian Gothic style
 Fernando Wood (1812–1881), Mayor of New York City

St. Paul's Chapel Churchyard (Broadway at Fulton Street)
 George Frederick Cooke (1756–1812), actor
 Richard Coote, 1st Earl of Bellomont (1636–1701), British colonial governor
 John Holt (1721–1784), publisher
 William Houstoun (1755–1813), Continental Congress delegate for whom Houston Street was named
 Richard Montgomery (1738–1775) Major General in the Continental Army during the American Revolution
 Stephen Rochefontaine (1755–1814), Continental Army officer during the American Revolution

References

External links

 
 At Find a Grave:
 Trinity Churchyard
 Trinity Churchyard Soldier's Monument
 Trinity Church Cemetery and Mausoleum
 Saint Paul's Chapel and Churchyard
 Hi-Res Photo Gallery of the Trinity Church Cemetery.
 Trinity Tombstone & Churchyard Gallery
 Trinity Church Cemetery and Mausoleum records at Trinity Wall Street Archives

Cemeteries on the National Register of Historic Places in Manhattan
Anglican cemeteries in the United States
Cemeteries in Manhattan
Financial District, Manhattan
Broadway (Manhattan)
 
Hudson Square
Cemeteries established in the 17th century